The 2015 Dutch Darts Masters was the fourth of nine PDC European Tour events on the 2015 PDC Pro Tour. The tournament took place at the Evenementenhal, Venray, between 5–7 June 2015. It featured a field of 48 players and £115,000 in prize money, with £25,000 going to the winner.

Michael van Gerwen won the tournament for the second year in a row after beating Justin Pipe 6–0 in the final.

Prize money
The prize fund was increased to £115,000 after being £100,000 for the previous two years.

Qualification and format
The top 16 players from the PDC ProTour Order of Merit on 8 March 2015 automatically qualified for the event and were seeded in the second round. The remaining 32 places went to players from three qualifying events - 20 from the UK Qualifier (held in Barnsley on 13 March), eight from the European Qualifier and four from the Host Nation Qualifier (both held at the venue the day before the event started. The following players took part in the tournament:

Top 16
  Michael van Gerwen (winner)
  Michael Smith (third round)
  James Wade (second round)
  Peter Wright (second round)
  Brendan Dolan (third round)
  Ian White (third round)
  Vincent van der Voort (second round)
  Simon Whitlock (third round)
  Mervyn King (quarter-finals)
  Justin Pipe (runner-up)
  Kim Huybrechts (quarter-finals)
  Terry Jenkins (semi-finals)
  Steve Beaton (third round)
  Jamie Caven (semi-finals)
  Stephen Bunting (second round)
  Dave Chisnall (third round)

UK Qualifier 
  Dean Winstanley (first round)
  Gary Stone (second round)
  William O'Connor (second round)
  Alan Norris (first round)
  Darren Webster (first round)
  Prakash Jiwa (first round)
  Wes Newton (first round)
  Jonny Clayton (first round)
  Ricky Evans (second round)
  John Henderson (second round)
  Gerwyn Price (first round)
  Kyle Anderson (quarter-finals)
  Joe Cullen (first round)
  Nathan Aspinall (third round)
  Jamie Robinson (first round)
  Josh Payne (quarter-finals)
  Daryl Gurney (first round)
  Wayne Jones (first round)
  Brett Claydon (first round)
  David Pallett (third round)

European Qualifier
  Davyd Venken (first round)
  Cristo Reyes (first round)
  Mensur Suljović (second round)
  Dimitri Van den Bergh (first round)
  Rowby-John Rodriguez (second round)
  John Michael (second round)
  Kenny Neyens (first round)
  Max Hopp (second round)

Host Nation Qualifier
  Christian Kist (second round)
  Jerry Hendriks (second round)
  Jeffrey de Zwaan (second round)
  Jelle Klaasen (second round)

Draw

References

2015 PDC European Tour
2015 in Dutch sport
June 2015 sports events in Europe